Buttermere is a village and civil parish in the county of Cumbria, England.

Village
The village of Buttermere lies between the Lake District lakes of Buttermere and Crummock Water, and is overlooked by the summits of Grasmoor to the north and High Stile to the south.

Buttermere church is dedicated to St James, and dates from 1840, replacing a chapel which was dedicated in 1507. It has a memorial plaque to Alfred Wainwright, in the sill of a window with a view of Haystacks where his ashes were scattered. It is grade II listed.

In the village, The Bridge Hotel, stands on a site tracing back to the 11th century, where an armoury and a bakery stood, in connection with the Water-Mill Earl Boether built higher up the stream. For seven centuries the mill worked continuously, the buildings being many times renewed. 
Circa 1734, the buildings were sold to the church, the curate being the Reverend Robert Walker. He obtained a beer licence and originated the 'Bridge Inn'. In 1837, Jonathan Thomas Sleap purchased the property, rebuilding the inn using stone obtained from the old water will. He changed the name to 'Victoria' upon the visit by Her Majesty in 1850.
In 1861, Mrs H Cooper inherited the property incorporating the bay windows, but it was the author Nicholas Size, who in 1920 extended and improved the building. Upon his death the new owner changed the name to 'The Bridge'. Peter and Janet McGuire who bought the hotel 1978, have owned the premises to the present day.

The Fish Inn was the home of Mary Robinson, known as the Maid of Buttermere, when her father was its landlord. It kept this name until 2019 and is now called the Buttermere Court Hotel.

Buttermere is situated on the B5289 road that runs beside Crummock Water and along the valley of the River Cocker north to Cockermouth. In the other direction, the B5289 runs via the steep Honister Pass, to Borrowdale and Keswick. A more direct, but more minor, road crosses the nearby Newlands Pass into the Newlands Valley and hence to Keswick.

Civil parish
The civil parish of Buttermere covers a considerable area around the village, including both Buttermere and Crummock Water lakes, the summit of Grasmoor, the north side of High Stile and the western side of Honister Pass. The smaller settlements of Brackenthwaite, to the north of Crummock Water, and Gatesgarth, at the foot of the Honister Pass, are included. The parish lies entirely within the Lake District National Park. At the time of the 2001 census the parish had a population of 127 living in 49 households, falling slightly at the 2011 Census to a population of 121 in 45 households.

For local government purposes the civil parish forms part of the district of Allerdale within the county of Cumbria. Historically part of Cumberland, it is within the Workington constituency of the United Kingdom Parliament. Prior to Brexit in 2020 it was part of the North West England constituency of the European Parliament.

Transport 
A free bus operates between Buttermere and Cockermouth with five return services per day.

Famous residents
Mary Robinson (1778–1837) — known as "The Maid of Buttermere" and the subject of writings by Samuel Taylor Coleridge, William Wordsworth, Charles Lamb and, more recently, Melvyn Bragg's novel of that name.

See also

Listed buildings in Buttermere, Cumbria

References

External links
 Cumbria County History Trust: Buttermere (nb: provisional research only – see Talk page)

 
Villages in Cumbria
Civil parishes in Cumbria
Allerdale